Subhomoy Das (born 26 December 1981) is an Indian first-class cricketer who plays for Bengal.

References

External links
 

1981 births
Living people
Indian cricketers
Bengal cricketers
Cricketers from Kolkata